Antoine Adrianus Raymondus de Kom (The Hague, 13 Augustus 1956) is a Dutch psychiatrist, writer and poet of Surinamese descent.

Biography
His grandfather was Anton de Kom, the famous Surinamese resistance fighter and anti-colonialist. In 1966 the family moved to Paramaribo, Suriname, where he spend his formative years. In 1971, de Kom studied medicine at the University of Amsterdam after which he specialised in psychiatry. He started his career as a forensic psychiatrist at the Pieter Baan Centre.

In 1981, he made his debut under the pseudonym Raymond Sarucco with Palmen in the magazine De Gids. The poems expressed de Kom's connection to the Caribbean and his fascination for their past and present. His first collection Tropen (1991) was nominated for the C. Buddingh'-prijs.

As a forensic psychiatrist, de Kom published Het misdadige brein: over het kwaad in onszelf (2012) in which he described fictitious conversations with historic criminals and despots. 

In 2013, Antoine de Kom gave the third Cola Debrot Lecture about slavery. In 2014, Antoine de Kom was awarded VSB Poetry Prize for Ritmisch zonder string (2013). When asked whether de Kom considered his writings Surinamese literature, de Kom replied that he could not answer that; he is just as much an outcast as his grandfather.

References

External links
Antoine de Kom at Poetry International
Antoine de Kom at Digital Library for Dutch Literature (in Dutch - De kilte in Brasilia available for free download)

1956 births
Dutch male poets
Dutch people of Surinamese descent
Dutch psychiatrists
Forensic psychiatrists
Living people
University of Amsterdam alumni
Writers from The Hague